Piero or Pierre Hugon (floruit 1600-1625) was a French servant of Anne of Denmark accused of stealing her jewels.

Career at the royal court in England
Piero Hugon was the first page of the bedchamber and trusted servant of Anne of Denmark, the wife of King James. Amongst the duties of daily attendance, in February 1613 he was sent to give Princess Elizabeth a jewel to wear at her wedding to Frederick V of the Palatinate. He travelled to the Danish court for her in 1618.

He may have been the queen's French servant noted in July 1614. Her brother Christian IV came to London incognito and managed to enter Denmark House (Somerset House) without being discovered. He was recognised in the audience chamber by "Cardel, a dancer" (Thomas Cardell) and the French servant agreed. He went to tell Anne of Denmark, who was dining in the gallery, and she laughed at him, thinking it was a kind of joke. Christian IV then entered the room. She took off a jewel she was wearing and gave it to the French servant.

There was another French-born gentleman servant, Arthur Bodren, who kept some household accounts and gave the architect Inigo Jones money for his work for the queen. Bodren had been a member of the household of the infant Princess Mary. Bodren, and the queen's Danish cook Hans Poppilman, were naturalised as denizens of England in July 1618. One of the pages of the bedchamber, Matthew Hairstanes, was Scottish.

Hugon is mentioned as "Mr Pero" and "Mr Peero" in the queen's inventories, in notes recording the moving of furniture.

Hugon was described as "her creature and favourite", and according to a letter describing the queen's last days, "Pira, and the Dutch woman that serves her" were the queen's closest attendants at the deathbed, excluding other courtiers from her presence.

After Anne of Denmark's funeral in May 1619, Piero Hugon and a "Dutch" servant called Anna were accused of theft. This Anna was perhaps the Danish Anna Kaas who had served the queen since her first days in Scotland, or Hugon's wife Anna who served the Queen as a chamberer.

The theft was discovered by one of the goldsmiths who supplied jewels to the queen, either William Herrick or George Heriot. An inventory of her jewels and plate was made by Sir Lionel Cranfield on 19 April 1619. George Heriot produced "models" or drawings of missing jewels which he had supplied to the queen, said to be worth £63,000.

Dutch Anna and Piero were taken to the Tower of London and charged with stealing jewels worth £30,000. James Howell heard rumours and wrote, "Q. Anne left a world of brave jewels behind, but one Piero, an outlandish man, who had the keeping of them, embezelled many, and is run away."

Piero Hugon had powerful supporters, soon after the arrest, at Greenwich, the Marquess of Buckingham promised François Juvenal, Marquis de Traisnel, who had come to offer the French king's condolences to James, that he would protect Hugon. The Marquis wrote to Buckingham that Louis XIII was convinced of his innocence. Buckingham and Robert Naunton corresponded with the English ambassador in Paris, Sir Edward Herbert and his brother Henry Herbert.

Another French ambassador François de Bassompierre, Count of Tillières, tried to help Hugon. A draft letter written in answer to Tillières gives more detail of the accusations and proceedings. King James ordered a chest confiscated in Paris from Hugon to be given to Mr (Henry) Herbert, the brother of Sir Edward Herbert, and Hugo was compensated with £500. The missing jewels were worth £60,000. Hugon was also accused of sending the queen's money and some religious items after her death to a nunnery and to some Jesuits to pray for her soul. These accusations were not sent to Tillières, after Hugon was interrogated in the Tower and he made a deal or bargain.
Edward Herbert discovered that the brother of Louis Richard, one of the queen's musicians, had carried packages to France for Hugon. 

Edward Herbert made an inventory of two chests belonging to Hugon, and the contents were thought to include some of the queen's jewels. He was concerned by various Catholic items he saw. There were many items of jewelry and costume, silverware, a bracelet set with turquoises and diamonds, and two bezoar stones. Attached to a string of pearls was Hugon's note that Anne of Denmark had given them to him on his wedding day with a large diamond, and the pearls should be sold and the proceeds used to say Masses for the queen. Marie de' Medici became involved, who declared via Pierre Brûlart, marquis de Sillery, Viscount Puisieux, that she had always been well-disposed to the service of the late queen Anne. Puisieux believed that Hugon was detained in England by the Spanish-favouring faction at court.

Analysis
Maureen Meikle and Helen M. Payne propose that Hugon had become a significant figure in the queen's household after the departure of Jean Drummond, Countess of Roxburghe. Assuming that many or most of the items in the inventory had belonged to the queen, including Catholic items, they suggest that Anne of Denmark had asked him to take them away to prevent their discovery, although the outcome was the exact opposite. Hugon's confession that money was intended to found a monastery in France ought to be taken as evidence for the queen's Catholic faith. Jemma Field argues from the same evidence that Anne of Denmark maintained a position that was a "middle path" or "via media" in her own religion.

In France

Piero Hugon was ennobled in France in 1618 and became the Sieur de Fourchaud, Givry, le Breuil et la Fouresthile. He had married Anne Rumler, who was probably a sister of Anne of Denmark's German-born apothecary, John Wolfgang Rumler. They were both naturalized as denizens of England on 4 May 1618. Anne attended the funeral of Anne of Denmark, listed as "Mrs Ann Rubellow" with the ladies of the Privy Chamber.

Hugon chose an armorial reflecting his service to the queen of England, which can be seen above a fireplace at Fourchaud. He had further dealings with the Richard brothers in 1620. 

Anne Hugon died in 1661 aged 85 at Fourchaud and was buried at Besson. Shortly before her death she renounced the Lutheran faith of her birth. Their eldest son and heir was Gaspard Hugon.

Fourchaud now belongs to Prince Charles-Henri de Lobkowicz.

References

Further reading
 Jemma Field, 'Anna of Denmark and the Politics of Religious Identity in Jacobean Scotland and England, c. 1592-1619', Northern Studies, 50 (2019), pp. 87-113

17th-century French people
Household of Anne of Denmark
Jewel thieves